Romeo Morri (10 March 1952 – 8 June 2022) was a Sammarinese politician.

Biography
Morri graduated in pharmacy at the University of Bologna. A member of the Sammarinese Christian Democratic Party, he served in the Grand and General Council from 1983 to 2012. He was also a Captain Regent of San Marino from 1992 to 1993.

Morri died on 8 June 2022 at the age of 70.

References

1952 births
2022 deaths
People from Serravalle (San Marino)
Captains Regent of San Marino
Secretaries of State for Labor of San Marino
Secretaries of State for Foreign and Political Affairs of San Marino
Secretaries of State for Education of San Marino
Secretaries of State for Health of San Marino
Sammarinese Christian Democratic Party politicians
University of Bologna alumni
Members of the Grand and General Council
20th-century politicians